Defending champion Martina Navratilova and her partner Gigi Fernández defeated Jana Novotná and Helena Suková in the final, 6–2, 6–4 to win the women's doubles tennis title at the 1990 US Open. It was Navratilova's ninth US Open women's doubles title and 31st and final major women's doubles title overall, the latter an all-time record. Novotná and Suková were attempting to achieve the Grand Slam.

Hana Mandlíková and Navratilova were the reigning champions, but Mandlíková didn't compete that year.

Seeds 
Champion seeds are indicated in bold text while text in italics indicates the round in which those seeds were eliminated.

Draw

Finals

Top half

Section 1

Section 2

Bottom half

Section 3

Section 4

External links 
1990 US Open – Women's draws and results at the International Tennis Federation

Women's Doubles
US Open (tennis) by year – Women's doubles
1990 in women's tennis
1990 in American women's sports